Berkovo is a rural locality (a village) in Vtorovskoye Rural Settlement, Kameshkovsky District, Vladimir Oblast, Russia. The population was 187 as of 2010.

Geography 
Berkovo is located 3 km southwest of Kameshkovo (the district's administrative centre) by road. Kameshkovo is the nearest rural locality.

References 

Rural localities in Kameshkovsky District